Brian Fox is an American painter who has created portraits of many entertainment and sports celebrities.

Career
Fox served as the commemorative artist for Major League Baseball’s 2007, 2008 and 2009 All Star Games, as well as the official artist for the 2007 World Series.

In 2009, Fox was hired to produce “Original Artist Sketch Cards” for TOPPS popular Series 1 Baseball Cards. Brian completed the sketches of forty current and retired baseball players, including Babe Ruth, Mickey Mantle, Jonathan Papelbon, Josh Hamilton, and Ichiro Suzuki.

Also in 2009, Fox was commissioned by the National Hockey League to produce original artwork for the 2010 NHL Winter Classic. Fox’s artwork appeared on the cover of the limited edition game day program. The painting was auctioned on NHL Auctions, on NHL.com. A portion of the proceeds benefited Hockey Fights Cancer and Curt’s Pitch for ALS.

Most recently, Fox collaborated with Olympic hockey player Jim Craig to create a collection of original artwork commemorating the 30 year anniversary of “Miracle on Ice” at the 1980 Winter Olympics.

Fox's clients have also included the National Football League. Disney, Foxwoods Resort Casino, Caesars Palace in Las Vegas and Mirage Hotel in Las Vegas.

Fox has helped raise money for charities and non-profits such as the ALS Association, Major League Baseball Players Trust, Josh Beckett Foundation, Ryan Howard Family Foundation, Providence College, Hockey Fights Cancer and the Jackie Robinson Foundation.

Work in collections
Athletes:
 Jackie Robinson Foundation
 Tom Brady
 Matt Light
 Curt Schilling
 Josh Beckett
 Michael Phelps
 Johan Santana
 Ichiro Suzuki
 Jim Thorpe
 Ray Allen
 George St. Pierre, Mixed Martial Arts Champion
 Alan Garcia, Thoroughbred Horse Racing Jockey

Celebrities and CEOs:
 Morgan Freeman
 Charlton Heston
 Keith Richards
 Ray Charles
 Johnny Depp
 Larry Lucchino – CEO of Boston Red Sox
 Oz Scott – Director of C.S.I. NY
 George Horowitz, President Everlast Worldwide Inc.
 Bill Casner, CEO WinStar Farms
 Charlie Jacobs, owner Boston Bruins

Education
Fox graduated from the UMass Dartmouth in 1990 with a bachelor's degree in Fine Arts.

Fox also has a Black belt in Shotokan Karate.

External links
 NHL: Boston Artist Captures Essence of Winter Classic https://web.archive.org/web/20110604013752/http://www.nhl.com/ice/news.htm?id=509992
 Providence Journal: Artist’s paintings so real they look like photos http://www.projo.com/news/bobkerr/kerr_column_17_01-17-10_5UH3D2N_v21.30f0c08.htm
 Fall River Herald: Somerset Native Has Bruch With Winter Classic http://www.heraldnews.com/highlight/x1820918032/PORTRAIT-ON-ICE-Somerset-native-has-brush-with-Winter-Classic
 Blast Magazine: Local Artist Brian Fox Taking Part in NHL Winter Classic http://blastmagazine.com/the-magazine/arts/art/2010/01/local-artist-brian-fox-taking-part-in-nhl-winter-classic/
 WBZ-TV: Red Sox, Patriots - Local Artist Shows Off Latest Work http://wbztv.com/video/?id=65520@wbz.dayport.com
 Saratoga Today: Brian Fox Majesty Power http://www.saratoga.com/horse-racing-blog/2009/08/rachel-alexandra-brian-t-fox-siros-majesty-power-and-insight.html
 Sherdog: First-Ever Autographed Limited Edition Prints of MMA Champion GSP http://www.sherdog.com/news/pressreleases/First-ever-Autographed-Limited-Edition-Prints-of-MMA-Champion-GSP-Now-Available-18145
Brian Fox: http://www.brianfoxstudios.com/

20th-century American painters
American male painters
21st-century American painters
21st-century American male artists
Living people
Year of birth missing (living people)
20th-century American male artists